BLW or blw may refer to:

 Baby-led weaning, an approach to adding complementary foods to a baby's diet of breast milk or formula
 Baldwin Locomotive Works, a defunct American manufacturer of railroad locomotives
 BLW, the IATA code for Beledweyne Airport, Somalia
 BLW, the Indian Railways station code for Balawali railway station, Uttar Pradesh, India
 blw, the ISO 639-3 code for Balangao language, Luzon, Philippines